El Cerrito (Catamarca) is a village and municipality within the Santa Maria Department of Catamarca Province in northwestern Argentina.

References

Populated places in Catamarca Province